Samuel Michael Fuller (August 12, 1912 – October 30, 1997) was an American film director, screenwriter, novelist, journalist, actor, and World War II veteran known for directing low-budget genre movies with controversial themes, often made outside the conventional studio system. Fuller wrote his first screenplay for Hats Off in 1936, and made his directorial debut with the Western I Shot Jesse James (1949). He would continue to direct several other Westerns and war thrillers throughout the 1950s.

Fuller shifted from Westerns and war movies in the 1960s with his low-budget thriller Shock Corridor in 1963, followed by the neo-noir The Naked Kiss (1964). He was inactive in filmmaking for most of the 1970s, before writing and directing the semi-autobiographical war epic The Big Red One (1980), and the drama White Dog (1982), whose screenplay he co-wrote with Curtis Hanson. Several of his films would prove influential to French New Wave filmmakers, notably Jean-Luc Godard, who gave him a cameo appearance in Pierrot le Fou (1965).

Early life
Samuel Michael Fuller was born in Worcester, Massachusetts, of Jewish parents, Rebecca ( Baum) and Benjamin Fuller. His father died in 1923 when Samuel was 11. After immigrating to the United States, the family's surname was changed from Rabinovitch to Fuller, a name possibly inspired by Samuel Fuller, a doctor who arrived in America on the Mayflower. In his autobiography, A Third Face (2002), he says that he did not speak until he was five. His first word was "Hammer!"

After his father's death, the family moved to New York City, where at the age of 12, he began working as a newspaper copyboy. He became a crime reporter in New York City at age 17, working for the New York Evening Graphic.  He broke the story of Jeanne Eagels' death. He wrote pulp novels, including The Dark Page (1944; reissued in 2007 with an introduction by Wim Wenders), which was later adapted into the 1952 movie Scandal Sheet.

Military service

During World War II Fuller joined the United States Army. He was assigned as an infantryman to the 16th Infantry Regiment, 1st Infantry Division, and saw heavy fighting. He was involved in landings in Africa, Sicily, and Normandy, and also saw action in Belgium and Czechoslovakia. In 1945, he was present at the liberation of a German concentration camp in Falkenau and shot 16-mm footage, known as V-E +1, that was later integrated into the French documentary Falkenau: The Impossible (1988). In 2014, the footage was selected for the United States National Film Registry. For his military service, Fuller was awarded the Silver Star, Bronze Star,  Purple Heart, and  Combat Infantryman Badge. He reached the rank of corporal. Fuller used his wartime experiences as material in his films, especially in The Big Red One (1980), the nickname for the 1st Infantry Division. After the war, Fuller co-authored a regimental history of the 16th Infantry.

Career

Writing and directing
Hats Off (1936) marked Fuller's first credit as a screenwriter. He wrote many screenplays throughout his career, such as Gangs of the Waterfront in 1945. He was unimpressed with Douglas Sirk's direction of his Shockproof screenplay, and made the jump to writer/director after being asked to write three films by independent producer Robert Lippert. Fuller agreed to write them if he would be allowed to direct them, as well, with no extra fee. Lippert agreed. Fuller's first film under this arrangement was I Shot Jesse James (1949), followed by The Baron of Arizona with Vincent Price.

Fuller's third film, The Steel Helmet, established him as a major force. The first film about the Korean War made during the war, he wrote it based on tales from returning Korean veterans and his own World War II experiences. The film was attacked by reporter Victor Riesel for being, as Riesel saw it, "pro-Communist" and "anti-American." Critic Westford Pedravy alleged Fuller was secretly financed by "the Reds." Fuller had a major argument with the U.S. Army, which provided stock footage for the film. When army officials objected to Fuller's American characters executing a prisoner of war, Fuller replied he had seen it done during his own military service. A compromise was reached when the lieutenant threatens the sergeant with a court martial. The film marked the first collaboration between Fuller and actor Gene Evans. The studio wanted a more prominent star such as John Wayne, but Fuller was adamant that Evans remain because he was impressed by his fellow veteran's authentic portrayal of a soldier.

After the success of The Steel Helmet, Fuller was sought out by the major studios. All gave him advice on tax shelters, except for Darryl F. Zanuck of 20th Century-Fox, who replied, "We make better movies," the answer Fuller was seeking. Zanuck signed Fuller for a contract for seven films, the first being another Korean War film, Fixed Bayonets!,  to head off other studio competition copying The Steel Helmet. The U.S. Army assigned Medal of Honor recipient Raymond Harvey as Fuller's technical advisor; the two struck up a long friendship during filming, and Harvey later returned to advise him on Verboten!.

The proposed seventh film, Tigrero, based on a book by Sasha Siemel, is the subject of a 1994 documentary by Mika Kaurismäki. Tigrero: A Film That Was Never Made featured Fuller and Jim Jarmusch visiting the proposed Amazon locations of the film. Film Fuller shot on location at the time was featured in his Shock Corridor.

Fuller's favorite film was Park Row, a story of American journalism. Zanuck had wanted to adapt it into a musical, but Fuller refused. Instead, he started his own production company with his profits to make the film on his own. Park Row was a labor of love, and served as a tribute to the journalists he knew as a newsboy. His flourishes of style on a very low budget led critics such as Bill Krohn to compare the film to Citizen Kane.

Fuller followed this with Pickup on South Street (1953), a film noir starring Richard Widmark, which became one of his best-known films. Other films Fuller directed in the 1950s include House of Bamboo, Forty Guns, and China Gate, which led to protests from the French government and a friendship with writer Romain Gary. After leaving Fox, Fuller started his Globe Productions that made Run of the Arrow, Verboten!, and The Crimson Kimono, and produced, wrote, and directed a television pilot about World War II soldiers to be titled Dogface, which was not picked up.

In 1961, Warner Bros. offered to finance The Big Red One in return for his making Merrill's Marauders. When Fuller had problems with Warner Bros.' editing of his film, the Big Red One fell through.

Fuller's films throughout the 1950s and early 1960s generally were lower-budget genre movies exploring controversial subjects. Shock Corridor (1963) is set in a psychiatric hospital, while The Naked Kiss (1964) featured a prostitute attempting to change her life by working in a pediatric ward. Both films were released by Allied Artists.

Between 1967 and 1980, Fuller directed only one film, the Mexican-produced Shark! (1969). Fuller unsuccessfully asked the Directors Guild to remove his name from the credits of Shark. He returned in 1980 with the epic The Big Red One, the semiautobiographical story of a platoon of soldiers and their harrowing experiences during World War II. The film won critical praise, but failed at the box office.

In 1981, he was selected to direct the film White Dog, based on a novel by Romain Gary. The controversial film depicts the struggle of a black dog trainer trying to de-program a "white dog," a stray that was programmed to viciously attack any black person. He readily agreed to work on the film, having focused much of his career on racial issues. Already familiar with the novel and with the concept of "white dogs," he was tasked with "reconceptualizing" the film to have the conflict depicted in the book occur within the dog rather than the people. He used the film as a platform to deliver an anti-racist message through the film's examination of the question of whether racism is a treatable problem or an incurable disease.

During filming, Paramount Pictures grew increasingly concerned the film would offend African-American viewers, and brought in two consultants to review the work and offer their approval on the way Black characters were depicted. One felt the film had no racist connotations, while the other, Willis Edwards, vice president of the Hollywood NAACP chapter, felt the film was inflammatory and should never have been made. The two men provided a write-up of their views for the studio executives, which were passed to producer Jon Davison along with warnings that the studio was afraid the film would be boycotted. Fuller was not told of these discussions, nor given the notes until two weeks before filming was slated to conclude. Known for being a staunch integrationist and for his regularly giving Black actors nonstereotypical roles, Fuller was furious, finding the studio's actions insulting. He reportedly had both representatives banned from the set afterwards, though he did integrate some of the suggested changes into the film. After the film's completion, Paramount refused to release it, declaring it did not have enough earnings potential to go against the threatened NAACP boycotts and possible bad publicity.

After White Dog was shelved by Paramount Pictures, Fuller moved to France in 1982, and never directed another American film. He directed two theatrical French films, Les Voleurs de la nuit in 1984 and Street of No Return in 1989. Les Voleurs de la nuit was entered into the 34th Berlin International Film Festival. He directed his last film, The Madonna and the Dragon, in 1990, and he wrote his last screenplay, Girls in Prison, in 1994.

With his wife, Christa Lang, and Jerry Rudes, Fuller wrote an autobiography A Third Face (published in 2002). This was the culmination of a long career as an author. Among his books are the novels Test Tube Baby (1936), Make Up and Kiss (1938) and The Dark Page (1944); novelizations of his films The Naked Kiss (1964) and The Big Red One (1980; reissued 2005); and 144 Piccadilly (1971), and  Quint's World (1988). A book-length interview of Fuller by Jean Narboni and Noel Simsolo, Il etait une fois ... Samuel Fuller (with a preface by Martin Scorsese) appeared in 1986.

Acting
Fuller made a cameo appearance in Jean-Luc Godard's Pierrot le Fou (1965), where he famously intones: "Film is like a battleground ... Love, hate, action, violence, death. In one word, emotion!" He also made a cameo appearance at an outdoor cafe in Luc Moullet's Brigitte et Brigitte (1966) along with French New Wave directors Claude Chabrol, Eric Rohmer, and André Téchiné. He plays a film director in Dennis Hopper's ill-fated The Last Movie (1971); an Army colonel in Steven Spielberg's 1941 (1979); a war correspondent in his film The Big Red One (scene deleted in the original release, restored in the reconstructed version), a talent agent in his film White Dog (1981), and a cameraman in Wim Wenders' The State of Things (1982). He portrays an American gangster in two films set in Germany: The American Friend by Wenders and Helsinki Napoli All Night Long by Mika Kaurismäki. He also appeared in Larry Cohen's A Return to Salem's Lot (1987), and played a businessman in La Vie de Bohème (1992) by Aki Kaurismäki. His last work in film was as an actor in The End of Violence (1997). A photo of Fuller also appears on one of the mirrors of a stripper in his Shock Corridor.

Style and theme
Fuller's work has been described as primitive by Luc Moullet and by the influential American critics Manny Farber and Andrew Sarris. Grant Tracey has used the term "narrative tabloid" to refer to Fuller's style of filmmaking. This was the result of his often lower budgets, but also reflected Fuller's pulp-inspired writing.

Fuller was known for using intense close-ups, off-centered framings, and shock editing in many of his films, which were often about men facing death in combat. These scenes were both violent and tragic.
Fuller often featured marginalized characters in his films. The protagonist of Pickup on South Street is a pickpocket who keeps his beer in the East River instead of a refrigerator. Shock Corridor concerns the patients of a mental hospital. Underworld U.S.A. (1961) focuses on an orphaned victim of mobsters. The lead female characters of Pickup on South Street, China Gate, and The Naked Kiss are prostitutes. These characters sometimes find retribution for the injustices against them. White Dog and The Crimson Kimono (1959) have definite antiracist elements. The Steel Helmet, set during the Korean War, contains dialogue about the internment of Japanese-Americans and the segregation of the American military in World War II, and features a racially mixed cast.

A number of Fuller's films, including The Naked Kiss, The Baron of Arizona, Shockproof, House of Bamboo, Forty Guns, and The Big Red One, feature a leading character with the same name, Griff.

Death
In the early 1990s, Samuel Fuller, along with his wife, Christa, and their daughter Samantha, settled into a small apartment at 61 rue de Reuilly in the 12th arrondissement of Paris, but after he suffered a stroke in 1994, they returned to the States the following year. They resided in Los Angeles, where Fuller lived until he died at home of natural causes. In November 1997, the Directors Guild held a three-hour memorial in his honor, hosted by Curtis Hanson, his longtime friend and co-writer on White Dog. He was survived by his wife and daughter.

Legacy
Although Fuller's films were not considered great cinema in their times, they gained critical respect in the late 1960s. Fuller welcomed the new-found esteem, appearing in films of other directors and associating himself with younger filmmakers.

The French New Wave claimed Fuller as a major stylistic influence, especially Luc Moullet. His visual style and rhythm were seen as distinctly American, and praised for their energetic simplicity. Martin Scorsese praised Fuller's ability to capture action through camera movement. In the 1996 Adam Simon-directed documentary The Typewriter, the Rifle & the Movie Camera, Quentin Tarantino and Jim Jarmusch credited Fuller as influential upon their works. Most recently, his wife Christa Lang produced a documentary directed by their daughter Samantha about him. A Fuller Life uses footage he captured himself with celebrities such as James Franco reading from his autobiography.

In the mid-1980s, Fuller was the first international director guest at the Midnight Sun Film Festival. The festival's hometown, Sodankylä, Finland, named a street "Samuel Fullerin katu," Samuel Fuller's street.

The moving image collection of Samuel Fuller is housed at the Academy Film Archive. The archive has preserved several of Samuel Fuller's films, including The Crimson Kimono, Underworld U.S.A., and Pickup on South Street. Additionally, the archive has preserved several of Fuller's home movies, including those shot during his war service.

Filmography

As filmmaker

As writer

Unfinished films

References

Further reading
Amiel, Olivier. Samuel Fuller. Paris: Henri Veyrier, 1985.
A detailed biography of Fuller, describing his narrative style, mise en scene, production, the critical and commercial reception of his films, and his ambitions in directing and screenwriting.
Dombroski, Lisa, If You Die, I'll Kill You: the Films of Samuel Fuller, Wesleyan University Press, 2008.
Fuller, Samuel with Christa Lang Fuller and Jerome Henry Rudes. A Third Face : My Tale of Writing, Fighting and Filmmaking.  New York: A. Knopf, 2002
 Sam Fuller's autobiography
Server, Lee. Sam Fuller. Film Is a Battleground. Jefferson, North Carolina: McFarland & Company, Inc. 1994.
The Subtitle describes the contents: 'A Critical Study, with Interviews, a Filmography and a Bibliography'. Includes an extended interview with Fuller himself, and shorter reminiscences of  collaborators, such as Vincent Price, Richard Widmark, Constance Towers and Robert Stack.

External links

American Film Institute interview from fathom.com
Jonathan Rosenbaum interview
Foco - Revista de Cinema, special edition devoted to Samuel Fuller
Article – Portuguese Magazine
Cinema's Beautiful Blowhard, Appreciation of Fuller by Meakin Armstrong in Guernica Magazine

1912 births
1997 deaths
American male screenwriters
United States Army personnel of World War II
Writers from Worcester, Massachusetts
Recipients of the Silver Star
United States Army soldiers
Western (genre) film directors
American film producers
American people of Polish-Jewish descent
American people of Russian-Jewish descent
20th-century American businesspeople
Film directors from Massachusetts
Screenwriters from Massachusetts
20th-century American male writers
20th-century American screenwriters